Andrew Beck may refer to:

 Andrew Beck (American football) (born 1996), American football tight end and fullback
 Andrew Beck (musician) (born 1986), American artist and musician
 Andrzej Beck (1926–2011), Polish-American engineer and businessman, also known as Andrew J. Beck